Eric Morris (born October 26, 1985) is an American football coach and former player. He is currently the head football coach at the University of North Texas. He was previously the head football coach at the University of the Incarnate Word and offensive coordinator at Washington State University.

Early life
Morris was born in Littlefield, Texas. He attended Shallowater High School in Shallowater, Texas, where he played basketball and football at the wide receiver and quarterback positions. Shallowater won the Division 4-2A basketball title during his senior season. Morris's father, Ray, coached basketball at the school.

College career
Morris played college football at the wide receiver position for the Texas Tech Red Raiders under Mike Leach from 2004 to 2008. Known for being small and elusive, Morris earned the nickname of "the Elf" during his college playing career. He was named first-team Academic All-Big 12 in 2007 and was second-team All-Big 12 for punt returning.

Professional career
Morris was signed by the Saskatchewan Roughriders as a street free agent in 2009. He was released in 2010.

Early coaching career
In 2010, Morris accepted a position as a graduate assistant for the Houston Cougars, a position at which he remained for two years. In 2011, Morris accepted the position of wide receivers coach at Washington State under his former college coach Mike Leach. Following the conclusion of the 2012 season, Morris accepted the position of co-offensive coordinator and receivers coach at his alma mater Texas Tech under head coach Kliff Kingsbury.

Texas Tech
Morris was promoted to full offensive coordinator following the departure of Sonny Cumbie in 2014.

Morris led an offense in 2015 that was ranked 2nd in the country in both total yardage and scoring. The offense was led by Sophomore QB Patrick Mahomes who threw for 4,683 yards and 36 TDs and by RB DeAndré Washington who rushed for 1,492 yards and 16 TDs, Washington being the first 1,000-yard rusher at Texas Tech in more than a decade. Morris coached 2016 NFL Draft picks Le'Raven Clark, DeAndré Washington, and Jakeem Grant.

Incarnate Word
On December 30, 2017, Morris was named head coach at the University of the Incarnate Word (FCS) in San Antonio, Texas. In 2018, Morris' first season at UIW, he led the Cardinals to a 6–5 record, a share of the Southland Conference championship, and an FCS Playoffs birth. Following a record-breaking season full of firsts for the UIW football program, Morris was selected as the 2018 Southland Conference Coach of the Year and a finalist for the Eddie Robinson Award National Coach of the Year.

Washington State
Morris returned to Pullman as offensive coordinator under head coach Jake Dickert. He acted in that capacity for one season before leaving to take the North Texas head coaching job prior to the Cougars’ bowl game.

North Texas
On December 13, 2022, Morris was announced as the new head coach for the North Texas Mean Green.

Head coaching record

References

External links
 Incarnate Word profile
 Texas Tech profile

1985 births
Living people
American players of Canadian football
Players of American football from Texas
People from Littlefield, Texas
American football wide receivers
Canadian football wide receivers
Texas Tech Red Raiders football players
Saskatchewan Roughriders players
Houston Cougars football coaches
Washington State Cougars football coaches
Texas Tech Red Raiders football coaches
Incarnate Word Cardinals football coaches
North Texas Mean Green football coaches